How to Get Away with Murder is an American legal drama television series that premiered on ABC on September 25, 2014. The series follows Annalise Keating, a law professor and criminal defense attorney at Middleton University, who selects five interns to work in her law firm: Wes Gibbins, Connor Walsh, Michaela Pratt, Asher Millstone, and Laurel Castillo – alongside Annalise's employees Frank Delfino and Bonnie Winterbottom, an associate lawyer. With the exception of the pilot, every episode's title is a phrase said by one of the characters in that episode.
 
The first season initially had an order of thirteen episodes, but ABC ordered a full season for the series with an additional two episodes after the first episode aired and was the top series debut of the season. On May 7, 2015, the show was renewed for a second season, which consisted of fifteen episodes like the previous season.  March 3, 2016, ABC announced that the show was renewed for a third season. On February 10, 2017, ABC renewed the show for a fourth season. On May 11, 2018, ABC announced the show was officially renewed for a fifth season. On May 10, 2019, the series was renewed for a sixth season. On July 11, 2019, it was announced the sixth season would be the last.

Series overview

Episodes

Season 1 (2014–15)

Season 2 (2015–16)

Season 3 (2016–17)

Season 4 (2017–18)

Season 5 (2018–19)

Season 6 (2019–20)

Ratings

References

External links

 
 

Episodes
How to Get Away with Murder